Antti Ilmari Vilhelm Kurvinen (born July 14, 1986) is a Finnish politician currently serving in the Parliament of Finland for the Centre Party at the Vaasa constituency.

Honors 

  Order of the Lion of Finland (Finland, 2022)

References

Living people
Members of the Parliament of Finland (2015–19)
Members of the Parliament of Finland (2019–23)
Ministers of Agriculture of Finland
Centre Party (Finland) politicians
21st-century Finnish politicians
1986 births